John Robie is a musician, producer and songwriter who has produced and/or written for a wildly diverse array of artists such as Chaka Khan, New Order, UB40, Cabaret Voltaire, Soulsonic Force, Boy George, C Bank, Planet Patrol, Quadrant 6, Laura Branigan, and Freeez, among many others.

Career
Robie launched his career as the co-writer and synthesizer “wizard” on one of the most important and seminal records in Hip-Hop history, Planet Rock by Soulsonic Force. (“One of the most influential songs of everything, it changed the world”- Rick Rubin in Rolling Stone’s “Top 100 Hip Hop Records” issue.)

Robie subsequently went on to produce other groundbreaking hits for Soulsonic Force; Looking For The Perfect Beat and Renegades Of Funk (later covered by Rage Against The Machine), and continued to pursue an audaciously experimental approach towards electronic music, which resulted in his pioneering a completely new musical genre, Electro. “One More Shot” performed by C-Bank and “Body Mechanic” performed by Quadrant 6, both written and produced by Robie, were among the first to define this art form which continues to thrive.

His songs have also been sampled by hundreds of artists making them among the most widely sampled in history. A short list would include City Girls, Lunchmoney Lewis, Snoop Dogg, Calvin Harris, Plump DJs, Jamie xx, LL Cool J, Black Eyed Peas, Limp Bizkit, and Tag Team.

He has recently entered into the world of video/film production making his directorial debut with the short film THE FUTURE IS MINE, which was released at the birth of Black Lives Matter (BLM) in the wake of George Floyd's murder and on the eve of arguably the most important election of our lifetime.

John Robie’s songs are represented by Downtown Music Services.

See also
Arthur Baker (musician)
Afrika Bambaataa
John Benitez

References

External links
 djsportal.com

Year of birth missing (living people)
Living people
Record producers from New York (state)
American audio engineers